Alfred Aaron de Pass (2 July 1861 – 17 December 1952) was a South African businessman, art-collector and philanthropist.

De Pass was born in Cape Town into a prominent family of Sephardic Jewish merchants from London. Their original surname, Shalom, was translated to the Spanish word for peace and became Paz before being anglicised to Pass in England. He was descended from Elias de Paz, who was among the original 12 Jewish brokers admitted to the privileges of the Royal Exchange in 1697. His father, Daniel de Pass (1838–1921), followed his own father and uncle to the Cape Colony, where the family were the largest ship owners in Cape Town and controlled a vast guano enterprise.

In 1867, Alfred de Pass was taken to England. He was educated in Ramsgate, in Gothenburg, and at the Royal School of Mines. He lived in the Colony of Natal in  1879–84, where he introduced a valuable strain of sugar that was disease-resistant.

He spent a considerable amount of his personal fortune on buying works of art, many of which he generously gave to several galleries and museums, specially at Falmouth, Bristol, Cambridge, Plymouth and Truro, as well as to the National Portrait Gallery, the British Museum and to Cape Town. He had a special relationship with Falmouth, regarding it as his home. This town received much of his art donations, which now constitute the core of the Falmouth Art Gallery.  He also purchased a large number of British and international works for the collection of the National Gallery of South Africa, now known as Iziko. He was married to Ethel Phoebe De Pass, née Salaman (1869–1910).

References

1861 births
1952 deaths
People from Cape Town
British people of Spanish-Jewish descent
South African Jews